Euerythra is a genus of moths in the family Erebidae. The genus was erected by Leon F. Harvey in 1876.

Species
Euerythra phasma Harvey, 1876 – red-tailed specter
Euerythra trimaculata Smith, 1888 – three-spotted specter
Euerythra virginea Dognin, 1924

References

Phaegopterina
Moth genera

Taxa named by Leon F. Harvey